Amenia station is a historic railroad station in Amenia, North Dakota, United States.  It was built in 1880, and was designed and/or built by the Northern Pacific Railroad.  The depot served Amenia until 1974.  It was listed on the National Register of Historic Places in 1977 as the Burlington Northern Depot, and delisted in 2016.

References

Railway stations in the United States opened in 1880
Railway stations on the National Register of Historic Places in North Dakota
Former Northern Pacific Railway stations
National Register of Historic Places in Cass County, North Dakota
Former National Register of Historic Places in North Dakota
Former railway stations in North Dakota
Transportation in Cass County, North Dakota
1880 establishments in Dakota Territory